Square is a financial services platform developed by Block, Inc. It is aimed at small-and medium-size businesses, allowing them to accept credit card payments and use tablet computers as payment registers for a point-of-sale system.

History
The inspiration for Square occurred to Jack Dorsey in 2009 when his friend Jim McKelvey was unable to complete a $2,000 sale of his glass faucets and fittings because he could not accept credit cards.

At the TechCrunch Disrupt conference in May 2011, Square announced the release of two apps, Square Card Case (later rebranded Square Wallet) and Square Register. Square Wallet, before it was removed from the Apple App Store and Google Play Store in 2014, allowed customers to set up a tab and pay for their order by providing their name (or a barcode) using a stored credit, debit, or gift card.

In April 2012, rival payment company Verifone claimed that the Square system was insecure and that a reasonably skilled programmer could write a replacement app that could use the Square device to skim a credit card and return its details, because of the lack of encryption. VeriFone posted a demonstration video and sample skimming app to its web site. Dorsey called VeriFone's claims "neither fair nor accurate", noting that all card data can be compromised by visually examining the card and that even if an attack succeeded, card issuers offered fraud protection. Square later introduced strong encryption on its devices. 

In August 2012, Starbucks announced it would use Square to process transactions with customers who pay via debit or credit card. In December 2012, Square introduced virtual gift cards. Physical gift cards were added in 2014.

In May 2013, the firm announced that its mobile payments service was available in Japan after agreeing to a partnership with Sumitomo Mitsui Card Corporation. In May 2013, Square announced it would no longer support firearms-related transactions.

In June 2013, the firm launched Square Market, which allows sellers to create a free online storefront with online payment processing functionality. Square Stand was introduced the same month.

In February 2014, Whole Foods Market announced it would use Square Register at select stores' sandwich counters, pizzerias and coffee, juice, wine and beer bars. In March 2014, the firm announced it would allow sellers to accept bitcoin on their own storefronts through Square Market. The seller takes no risk of bitcoin value fluctuations.

In July 2014 the firm announced a card reader that would accept chip cards and contactless cards. In June 2015, Apple announced Square would release a Reader capable of accepting Apple Pay and other contactless payments. 

In 2014, Square launched Square Capital and an online booking tool.

In 2015, Square launched a reader for Android and iOS that accepts contactless and chip card payments. That year the firm launched Square Payroll for small business owners to process payroll.

In October 2017 Square Register, was announced for small to medium-sized businesses. Square launched in the UK in 2017.

In August 2018, Square released a version of its magstripe reader with a Lightning connector, allowing it to be used on iPhones without a headphone jack. In October 2018, the company introduced its Terminal product. That Square began allowing merchants to develop custom interfaces for the platform, via an application programming interface.

Square Financial Services launched in 2021, based in Salt Lake City after receiving FDIC and Utah Department of Financial Institutions approval.

Devices

Square Reader for magstripe

The Square Reader was the firm's first product. It accepts credit card payments by connecting to a mobile device's audio jack. The original version consisted of a read head directly wired to a 3.5 mm audio jack, through which unencrypted, analog card information was fed to smartphones for amplification and digitization. Square Reader also supports Apple Lightning on post-2018 products.

Neither card numbers, nor magnetic stripe data, nor security codes are stored on Square devices. Square Reader is Payment Card Industry Data Security Standard (PCI) compliant and Verisign certified.

Square provides its magnetic stripe card readers to sellers without charge. Square charges $99 for Square Stand and $29 for its chip-based Square Reader. The Square app is freely downloadable from the Apple App Store and the Google Play Store.

Square charges a fee of 2.6% plus $0.10 on every electronically scanned credit card transaction or 3.50% plus $0.15 per manually-entered transaction. No monthly or set-up fees are charged. The firm claims that its costs are, on average, lower than the costs charged by conventional credit card processors. Swiped payments are deposited directly into a seller's bank account within 1-2 business days. In some instances, Square withholds payments pending issues related to chargebacks.

Square Reader for contactless and chip
Square Reader's bluetooth-connected reader allows Android and iOS devices to accept contactless and chip card payments.

Square Terminal
 
Square Terminal features a display, prints receipts, and accepts chip, swipe, and contactless payments. Unlike the basic card reader, it does not require a phone or tablet. It is more affordable than Square Register. It was designed to replace the older credit card terminals encountered in many stores. Square argued that these terminals often come with onerous contracts, and are not a positive experience for consumers. Terminal works with WiFi and is powered by an all-day battery, so it can be carried around the store and handed to customers.

Square Stand

Square Stand turns the Apple iPad into a more complete point-of-sale system.

Square Register
Square Register is a standalone point-of-sale system. It consists of a merchant tablet and a customer tablet, with a built-in swipe, chip, and contactless reader.

Services
The firm generates revenue from selling services to businesses, including subscription-based products such as Customer Engagement, Square Payroll, and Square Register. 

Square Payroll charges sellers a monthly fee of $20 plus $5 for each employee paid.

Square offers virtual and pysical gift cards. A QR code is scanned to use the funds.

Square Market enables businesses to accept online payments.

Square Capital offers financing to merchants using Square.

An online booking tool allows small businesses to accept appointments on their website, but does not accept restaurant reservations.

Square Payroll allows small business owners to process payroll. The product is available in all 50 states + DC. It automatically handles withholding, payments, and tax filings.

Merchants can develop custom interfaces for the platform, via an application programming interface.

Square Financial Services offers other financial services.

Firearms
Square does not support firearms-related transactions. The company denied that this move was related to the debate over gun control.

Controversies
In June 2019, The Wall Street Journal reported that Square inadvertently sent transaction receipts to the wrong email address, leading to adverse consequences such as outing one woman's impending divorce.

A Canadian food truck which sold Cuban coffee faced a loss of C$14,000 because transactions were processed through a Canadian subsidiary of Chase Manhattan Bank, contracted by Square to handle its Canadian accounts. As the parent company is governed by US laws, the bank would have been subject with charges of trafficking in prohibited Cuban goods if it had processed the fund transactions.

Square marks certain merchants as high risk, a designation that can come suddenly and without warning.  Merchants classified as risky can have 20-30% of their funds withheld to handle chargebacks and disputes.  Square received criticism from affected merchants due to the opaque nature of the process, its suddenness, and difficulties in appealing the designation.

See also
 PayPal

References

External links
 

Block, Inc.
Android (operating system) software
IOS software
Online payments
Payment service providers